The Tour of Siam was an annual professional road bicycle racing stage race held in Thailand from 2005 to 2007 as part of the UCI Asia Tour.

Past winners

General classification

Points classification

Mountains classification

Asian rider classification

Young rider classification

Team classification

External links
 
 Tour of Siam at cqranking.com

Cycle races in Thailand
Defunct cycling races in Thailand
UCI Asia Tour races
Recurring sporting events established in 2005
2005 establishments in Thailand
Recurring sporting events disestablished in 2007
2007 disestablishments in Thailand